This is a list of Polish television related events from 1994.

Events
1 January - Public Polish TV channels with exception for TVP1 switched from SECAM to PAL.
30 April - Poland enters the Eurovision Song Contest for the first time with "To nie ja!" performed by Edyta Górniak.

Debuts

International

Television shows

Ending this year

Births

Deaths